Emilio Lecuona (30 August 1935 – 12 February 2004) was a Spanish gymnast. He competed in eight events at the 1960 Summer Olympics.

References

1935 births
2004 deaths
Spanish male artistic gymnasts
Olympic gymnasts of Spain
Gymnasts at the 1960 Summer Olympics
Gymnasts from Barcelona